"Trouble" is a song recorded by Australian singer/songwriter Vassy. The track became Vassy's eleventh charted single in the United States on Billboard's Dance Club Songs chart, as well as her eighth charted single at Dance/Mix Show Airplay, where it reached number 5 in December 2019, her highest on the latter so far.

Background
In an interview with Billboard's Dance Chart Upstarts, Vassy noted that "'Trouble' is a song about taking risks in life, about not being afraid to attract a little trouble... It's about how you look at life, having a positive outlook. 'Trouble' is more of an attitude than a predicament. She went further to add that "I wanted to create a song that embodies an uplifting tone with a little bit of attitude to encourage my fans to take chances and not be afraid of the rejections that they may encounter in life. It's a nice balance of pop-leaning dance with a fusion of EDM drops, yet embracing a more traditional songwriting style. I wanted to embellish and embody all the different musical elements that make up who I am today as an artist. After all, I like a little trouble in my life."

Track listings
Digital download and stream
"Trouble" – 3:00
"Trouble" (extended mix) – 3:17

Charts

Weekly charts

Year-end charts

References

External links
Official Video at YouTube

2019 songs
2019 singles
Songs written by Vassy (singer)
Spinnin' Records singles
Columbia Records singles
Sony Music singles
Vassy (singer) songs